Liz Deighan (born c. 1953, Northumberland) is a former association football player, who played for the England national women's football team, as well as clubs including Fodens WFC, Southport WFC, and St Helens W.F.C.. She won 48 England caps, making her debut against France on 7 November 1974.

Although often deployed in attack early in her career, Deighan made a name for herself as a midfielder.

She scored in the semi final of the 1984 European Competition for Women's Football, in which England reached the final before losing to Sweden on penalties. Her final cap came in the Mundialito in September 1985.

Domestically she won the Women's FA Cup in the 1979–80 season with St Helens, and reached three other finals as runner-up with the club during the 1980s.

Upon retirement from the game she trained as a coach, including a spell in charge of England's Under-21 ladies. In 1989 Deighan founded and managed Newton Ladies FC, the team who would eventually become Liverpool F.C. Women.

References

1950s births
Year of birth uncertain
Living people
Women's association football midfielders
Footballers from Northumberland
English women's footballers
English women's football managers
England women's international footballers
Liverpool L.F.C. managers
Fodens Ladies F.C. players